Aldanites is an extinct cephalopod genus belonging to the ammonoid order Goniatitida.

Aldanites, named by Ruzhencev, 1965, is confined to the Lower Pennsylvanian Period (late Carboniferous) and is included in the Orulganitidae, a family in the Schistoceratacea, a goniatitid superfamily.

References

Aldanites-Paleodb
 Saunders, Work, and Nikolaeva 1999. Evolution of Complexity in Paleozoic Ammonoid Sutures, supplementary material 
 W. M. Furnish, et al. 2009. Treatise on Invertebrate Paleontology, Part L, Revised: Mollusca 4, Volume 2: Carboniferous and Permian Ammonoidea (Goniatitida and Prolecanitida) pp1–258.

Goniatitida genera
Orulganitidae